The Florida State Seminoles softball program is a college softball team that represents Florida State University in the Atlantic Coast Conference in the National Collegiate Athletic Association. The team has had two head coaches since it started playing organized softball in the 1993 season.

Key

Coaches

Notes

References

Lists of college softball head coaches in the United States

Florida State Seminoles softball